Project Information Literacy (PIL) is a research institute that conducts national, ongoing scholarly studies on how early adults find and use information as they progress through, and beyond, their higher education years.

Organization 
Based in California's San Francisco Bay Area, Project Information Literacy, Inc. (PIL) is a public benefit 501(c)(3) organization. Alison J. Head, the executive director and lead researcher, is an expert in the field of information literacy research.

PIL began in 2008 as a partnership with the University of Washington Information School with Alison J. Head and Michael Eisenberg, dean emeritus and professor at the school, as co-directors. Both Head and Eisenberg have extensive experience conducting and publishing research on information literacy and the information-seeking behavior of Internet users. In 2012, PIL became a nonprofit with Head as sole director. In 2016 PIL ended its formal relationship with the Information School.

Work 
PIL's studies have been conducted using small teams of researchers drawn from libraries and schools of library and information science across the United States. To date, 20,987 early adults have participated in PIL studies. The institutional sample for PIL studies consists of 93 public and private colleges, universities, and community colleges, as well as 34 high schools located in the U.S. A 2016 study included data from Canadian institutions.

PIL has worked with members of a sample of 260 institutions. Partners include four-year private and public universities and colleges in the U.S. including Harvard College, The Ohio State University, University of Texas at Austin, University of Michigan, The University of Washington, DePaul University, Oklahoma State University, University of Alaska, Wellesley College and numerous community colleges. Each PIL study undergoes ethical review at the participating institutions and at the host institution where the study is based. (p. 80) Studies use a mixed-methods approach. PIL has conducted student surveys, focus groups, content analysis of research handouts, extensive interviews, and computational analysis of social media interactions. Final reports include summaries of key findings, in-depth data, and recommendations. All reports are Open Access, available from the PIL website at no charge.

PIL has produced 12 major research reports, investigating the experiences of college students and recent graduates as they interact with information for school, for life, for work, and most recently, for engaging with the news. On October 12, 2022, PIL published a retrospective report that summarized all 12 reports from the College Study, documented their impact, and included lessons learned from 14 years of research. In 2020, a PIL team released a two-part series on COVID-19 and the first 100 days of U.S. news coverage, which included interactive information visualizations and extensive set of learning resources for promoting news literacy. Researchers used MediaCloud to pull out and analyze the "shape of news" (I love that concept) and how it was visually represented through images." In 2019, PIL examined the awareness and concerns of college students in the age of algorithms, and released the report in January, 2020. The study was supported by the John S. and James L. Knight Foundation, the Harvard Graduate School of Education, Electronic Research and Libraries (ER&L), a leading library conference, and the School of Library and Information Science at the University of South Carolina. This publication won the 2020 Ilene F. Rockman Instruction Publication of the Year, bestowed by The Association of College and Research Libraries.   In October 2018, PIL released the findings of a study of students' news engagement practices in the "post-truth" era, sponsored by the Knight Foundation and the Association of College and Research Libraries (ACRL), a division of the American Library Association. Another project, The Reading List for Life, leverages PIL's research findings to develop a web application for adult learners in public libraries, and is a collaboration between PIL, The Open Syllabus Project at Columbia University, and the metaLAB@Harvard.In 2016, PIL published a study, funded by the Information School at The University of Washington, that examined library spaces and included data from interviews with architects and library leaders.

PIL's research results have been disseminated through the reports posted on its open access website, numerous articles, conference presentations, webcasts, podcasts, and videos on its YouTube channel. PIL has been recognized as an important source of longitudinal information on the information behaviors of students. As Barbara Fister notes, "[t]his is hands-down the most important long-term, multi-institutional research project ever launched on how students use information for school and beyond." PIL reports are frequently cited in scholarly articles and linked from academic library webpages about information literacy, used in workshops for faculty, and in student learning. The studies provide information about students' and graduates' information seeking strategies through the lens of the student experience across multiple institutional sites in the U.S. and are frequently reported on in The Chronicle of Higher Education, Inside Higher Education, Education Week, and Library Journal.

In 2021 PIL launched the Provocation Series of occasional papers on pressing issues around literacy, building on a solid decade of original research from PIL into students’ information practices in the digital age, other scholarship, and the flow of current events. Each essay is accompanied by an author's reflection and discussion questions. The first in the series, "Lizard People in the Library," by Barbara Fister demonstrates how current media literacy and information literacy instruction falls shorts of equipping students for life in a world of weaponized information. This essay was republished in a slightly different form by The Atlantic, as "The Librarian War Against QAnon". In the second essay, “Reading in the Age of Distrust,” Dr. Alison Head explores why many academicians fail to consider how students read, and how they learn to read deeply for academic and personal purposes. Dr. Kirsten Hostetler wrote the third essay, "The iSchool Equation," which focuses on a gap in the iSchool curriculum. As the effects of mis- and disinformation take a toll on social cohesion, librarians are often positioned as experts who can guide their communities toward a better understanding of our confusing information landscape, but few graduate programs prepare them for teaching. The fourth essay, "Tell Me Sweet Little Lies: Racism as a Form of Persistent Malinformation" by Dr. Nicole A. Cooke proposes critical cultural literacy as a defence against persistent racist malinformation. In the fifth essay, "Information Literacy for Mortals," Mike Caulfield combines decision-making theory & research on his SIFT evaluation method to advocate a strengths-based approach. In 2022, Barbara Fister explores the links between search tools that narrow our focus, results that widen divides and how the weaponization of uncertainty impacts information literacy in "Principled Uncertainty: Why Learning to Ask Good Questions Matters More than Finding Answers."

PIL has created a series of Smart Talk interviews with leading voices related to its core purpose of understanding how early adults use information and technology to learn. Interviewees include: Ken Bain, Char Booth, Nicholas Carr, Mike Caulfield, Jenae Cohn, David Conley, Cathy Davidson, Katie Davis, Dale Dougherty, Sari Feldman, Barbara Fister, Eric Gordon, Renee Hobbs, Rebecca Moore Howard, Sandra Jamieson, Kyle Jones, Joan Lippincott, Robert Lue, Andrea Lunsford, Shannon Mattern, P. Takis Metaxas, Ryan M. Milner, Peter Morville, John Palfrey, Whitney Philliips, Russell Poldrack, Lee Rainie, Justin Reich Howard Rheingold, Dan Rothstein, Jeffrey Schnapp, Howie Schneider, Zach Sims, Peter Suber, Shyam Sundar, Francesca Tripodi, S. Craig Watkins, David Weinberger, and Mary-Ann Winkelmes.

PIL hosts an annual fellowship for emerging researchers in information literacy, and runs a visiting scholar research program, with sites including the University of Nebraska—Lincoln, Purdue University, and the University of Pittsburgh University Library System.

Funding 
PIL has received funding from major granting organizations, companies and institutions

 The Institute of Museum and Library Services (IMLS) 2011, 2013–2015
 John S. and James L. Knight Foundation
 John D. and Catherine T. MacArthur Foundation (General Division) 2009–2011
 Alfred P. Sloan Foundation
 Harvard Graduate School of Education
 Berkman Klein Center for Internet & Society, Harvard University 2011
 Electronic Research and Libraries (ER&L)
 School of Library and Information Science at the University of South Carolina
 Association of College and Research Libraries
 University of Washington Information School
 Cable in the Classroom
 Cengage Learning 2010, 2012
 ProQuest 2008–2009

Bibliography

Research studies 
All reports produced by PIL are open access under the CC-BY-NC license; many include open access data sets.
 Head, A.J., Braun, S., MacMillan, M., Yurkofsky, J. & Bull, A.C. (2020).Covid-19: The first 100 days of U.S. news coverage: Lessons about the media ecosystem for librarians, educators, students, and journalists. Project Information Literacy Research Institute. Retrieved November 28, 2020, from https://projectinfolit.org/publications/covid-19-the-first-100-days/
 Head, A.J., Fister, B. & MacMillan, M. (2020). Information Literacy in the Age of Algorithms: Student Experiences with News and Information, and the Need for Change, Project Information Literacy Research Institute. Retrieved November 28, 2020 from https://projectinfolit.org/publications/algorithm-study/
 Head, A.J., Wihbey, J., Metaxas, P. Takis, MacMillan, M., & Cohen, D. (2018). How Students Engage with News: Five Takeaways for Educators, Journalists, and Librarians," Project Information Literacy Research Institute. Retrieved November 28, 2020 from https://projectinfolit.org/publications/news-study/
 Head, A.J. (2016). Planning and designing academic library learning spaces: Expert perspectives of architects, librarians, and library consultants. Project Information Literacy, Practitioner Series Research Report. Retrieved November 28, 2020 from https://projectinfolit.org/publications/library-space-study/
 Head, A.J. (2016). Staying smart: How today's graduates continue to learn once they complete college. Project Information Literacy, Passage Studies Research Report. Retrieved November 28, 2020 from https://projectinfolit.org/publications/lifelong-learning-study/
 Head, A.J. (2013). Learning the ropes: How freshmen conduct course research once they enter college. Project Information Literacy, Passage Studies Research Report. Retrieved November 28, 2020 from https://projectinfolit.org/publications/first-year-experience-study/
 Head, A.J. (2012). Learning curve: How college graduates solve information problems once they join the workplace. Project Information Literacy, Passage Studies Research Report. Retrieved November 28, 2020 from https://projectinfolit.org/publications/workplace-study/
 Head, A.J. & Eisenberg, M.B. (2011). Balancing act: How college students manage technology while in the library during crunch time. Project Information Literacy Research Report. Information School, University of Washington. Retrieved November 28, 2020 from https://projectinfolit.org/publications/technology-usage-study/
 Head, A.J. & Eisenberg, M.B. (2010). Truth be told: How college students evaluate and use information in the digital age. Project Information Literacy Progress Report. Information School, University of Washington. Retrieved November 28, 2020 from https://projectinfolit.org/publications/evaluating-information-study/
 Head, A.J. & Eisenberg, M.B. (2010). Assigning inquiry: How handouts for research assignments guide today's college students. Project Information Literacy Progress Report. Information School, University of Washington. Retrieved November 28, 2020 from https://projectinfolit.org/publications/research-handouts-study/
 Head, A.J. & Eisenberg, M.B. (2009). Lessons learned: How college students seek information in the digital age. Project Information Literacy First Year Report with Student Survey Findings. Information School, University of Washington. Retrieved November 28, 2020 from https://projectinfolit.org/publications/information-seeking-habits/
 Head, A.J. & Eisenberg, M.B. (2009). Finding context: What today's college students say about conducting research in the digital age. Project Information Literacy Progress Report. Information School, University of Washington. Retrieved November 28, 2020 from https://projectinfolit.org/publications/finding-context-study/

Peer-reviewed articles 
 Bull, A.C., MacMillan, M., & Head, A.J. (July 21, 2021). Dismantling the evaluation framework, In the Library with the Lead Pipe. Retrieved September 19, 2021 from https://www.inthelibrarywiththeleadpipe.org/2021/dismantling-evaluation/
 Head, A.J., Bull, A.C., & MacMillan, M. (Oct. 2019). Asking the right questions: Bridging gaps between information literacy assessment approaches, Against the Grain, 31(4). Retrieved Oct 17, 2019 from https://against-the-grain.com/2019/10/v314-asking-the-right-questions-bridging-gaps-between-information-literacy-assessment-approaches/
 Head, A.J., DeFrain, E., Fister, B. & MacMillan, M. (Aug. 2019). Across the great divide: How today's college students engage with news, First Monday, 24(8). Retrieved August 5, 2019 from https://firstmonday.org/ojs/index.php/fm/article/view/10166/8057 doi: https://doi.org/10.5210/fm.v24i8.10166
 Head, A.J., Van Hoeck, M., & Hostetler, K. (Oct. 2017). Why blogs endure: A study of recent college graduates and motivations for blog readership. First Monday, 22(10). Retrieved October 15, 2017 from http://firstmonday.org/ojs/index.php/fm/article/view/8065/6539
 Head, A.J. (2017). Posing the million-dollar question: What happens after graduation? Journal of Information Literacy, 11(1), 80–90. Retrieved October 15, 2017 from https://ojs.lboro.ac.uk/JIL/article/view/PRA-V11-I1-4/2481
 Head, A.J., Van Hoeck, M., & Garson, D.S. (Feb. 2015). Lifelong learning in the digital age: A content analysis of recent research on participation.First Monday, 20(2). Retrieved October 15, 2017 from http://firstmonday.org/ojs/index.php/fm/article/view/5857/4210
 Head, A.J., Van Hoeck, M., Eschler, J., & Fullerton, S. (2013). What information competencies matter in today's workplace? Library and Information Research, 37(114), 75–104. Retrieved September 15, 2020 from https://www.lirgjournal.org.uk/index.php/lir/article/view/557
 Head, A.J. & Eisenberg, M. B. (Apr. 2011). How college students use the web to conduct everyday life research. First Monday, 16(4). Retrieved October 15, 2017 from http://firstmonday.org/article/view/3484/2857
 Head, A.J. & Eisenberg, M. B. (Mar. 2010). How today's college students use Wikipedia for course-related research. First Monday, 15(3). Retrieved October 15, 2017 from http://firstmonday.org/ojs/index.php/fm/article/view/2830
 Head, A.J. (2008). Information literacy from the trenches: How do humanities and social science majors conduct academic research? College and Research Libraries, 69(5), 427–446. Retrieved October 15, 2017 from http://crl.acrl.org/index.php/crl/article/view/15957
 Head, A.J. (Jul. 2007). Beyond Google: How do students conduct academic research? First Monday, 12(7). Retrieved October 15, 2017 from http://firstmonday.org/ojs/index.php/fm/article/view/1998

Proceedings 
 Head, A.J. (2013). Project Information Literacy: What can be learned about the information-seeking behavior of today's college students? Association of College and Research Libraries (ACRL) Annual Conference Proceedings. Chicago: American Library Association. Retrieved September 15, 2020 from http://www.ala.org/acrl/sites/ala.org.acrl/files/content/conferences/confsandpreconfs/2013/papers/Head_Project.pdf

Opinion and editorials 
 Head, A.J., Fister, B., & MacMillan, M. (Mar. 15, 2019). News digests to the rescue? Storybench. Retrieved August 5, 2019 from http://www.storybench.org/news-digests-to-the-rescue/
 Head, A.J. & Wihbey, J. (Apr. 8, 2017). The importance of truth workers in an era of factual recession. Medium. Retrieved October 15, 2017 from https://medium.com/@ajhead1/the-importance-of-truth-workers-in-an-era-of-factual-recession-7487fda8eb3b
 Head, A.J. & Wihbey, J. (Jul. 10, 2014). At sea in a deluge of data. The Chronicle of Higher Education. Retrieved October 15, 2017 from http://chronicle.com/article/At-Sea-in-a-Deluge-of-Data/147477/
 Head, A.J. (Dec. 8, 2012). Old-school job skills you won't find on Google. The Seattle Times. Retrieved September 15, 2020 from https://www.seattletimes.com/opinion/op-ed-old-school-job-skills-you-wonrsquot-find-on-google/
 Head, A.J. & Eisenberg, M.B. (Jun. 3, 2011). College students eager to learn but need help negotiating information overload. The Seattle Times. Retrieved September 15, 2020 from https://www.seattletimes.com/opinion/college-students-eager-to-learn-but-need-help-negotiating-information-overload
 Eisenberg, M.B. & Head, A.J. (May 2, 2009). Add 'research' to education's traditional three Rs. The Seattle Times. Retrieved September 15, 2020 from https://www.seattletimes.com/opinion/guest-columnists-add-research-to-educations-traditional-three-rs/

Provocation series essays 
 Fister, B. (2022). 'Principled uncertainty: Why learning to ask good questions matters more than finding answers.'PIL Provocation Series, Vol. 2, no.1, Project Information Literacy Research Institute. Retrieved February 15, 2022 from https://projectinfolit.org/pubs/provocation-series/essays/principled-uncertainty.html
 Caulfield, M. (2021). 'Information literacy for mortals.' PIL Provocation Series, Vol. 1, no. 5, Project Information Literacy Research Institute. Retrieved December 15, 2021 from https://projectinfolit.org/pubs/provocation-series/essays/information-literacy-for-mortals.html
 Cooke, N.A. (2021). 'Tell me sweet little lies: Racism as a form of persistent malinformation.' PIL Provocation Series, Vol. 1, no. 4, Project Information Literacy Research Institute. Retrieved August 17, 2021 from https://projectinfolit.org/pubs/provocation-series/essays/tell-me-sweet-little-lies.html
 Hostetler, K. (2021). The iSchool equation. PIL Provocation Series, Vol. 1, no. 3, Project Information Literacy Research Institute. Retrieved June 16, 2021 from https://projectinfolit.org/pubs/provocation-series/essays/the-ischool-equation.html
 Head, Alison J. (2021). Reading in the age of distrust. PIL Provocation Series, Vol. 1, no. 2, Project Information Literacy Research Institute. Retrieved February 2, 2021 from https://projectinfolit.org/pubs/provocation-series/essays/reading-in-the-age-of-distrust.html
 Fister, B. (2021). Lizard people in the library. PIL Provocation Series, Vol. 1, no. 1, Project Information Literacy Research Institute. Retrieved February 2, 2021 from https://projectinfolit.org/pubs/provocation-series/essays/lizard-people-in-the-library.html

See also
 Higher education
 Information literacy
 Library instruction
 Media literacy

References

External links 
 Project Information Literacy
 Project Information Literacy Youtube Channel

Research institutes in California